Pseudalcantarea macropetala, synonym Tillandsia macropetala, is a species of flowering plant in the family Bromeliaceae, native to central and southern Mexico. It was first described by Heinrich Wawra von Fernsee in 1887 as Platystachys viridiflora.

References

Tillandsioideae
Flora of Mexico
Plants described in 1887